Gemmulimitra neocaledonica is a species of sea snail, a marine gastropod mollusk, in the family Mitridae, the miters or miter snails.

Distribution

References

neocaledonica
Gastropods described in 2018